György Fischer (12 August 1935 – 25 October 2020) was a Hungarian pianist and conductor.

Life
Assistant to Herbert von Karajan at the Vienna Opera, he became a specialist in the works of Mozart, conducting operas in Cologne, Munich, and South America.
He performed with the Australian Opera in 1987. First he married opera singer Lucia Popp. After being divorced from her he married American violinist Ida Bieler. His sister-in-law was Hungarian actress Flóra Kádár, the first wife of his elder brother, DOP and photojournalist Péter Fischer.

References

Bibliography

 

1935 births
2020 deaths
Hungarian classical pianists
Male classical pianists
Hungarian conductors (music)
Male conductors (music)
Musicians from Budapest
21st-century conductors (music)
21st-century classical pianists
21st-century Hungarian male musicians